15:00 na żywo (Eng. 15:00 Live) is a Polish newscast broadcast by TVN24 from Monday to Friday between 3 and 4 p.m. CET. It is presented by Anna Jędrzejowska and debuted on air on 20 June 2011.

The program continues coverage of stories followed during 9 prior hours of hard-news programs, which consist of Poranek TVN24 and Dzień na żywo. The show often takes a swifter pace compared to the network's other programming, making a larger focus on breaking-news events with live correspondents. Coverage includes correspondents on location and in studio, in addition to analysis from pundits or experts.

The team 
Host: Anna Jędrzejowska 

Guest Hosts: Jakub Porada, Michał Cholewiński, Krzysztof Górlicki

Reference 

Polish television news shows
2011 Polish television series debuts
2010s Polish television series
2020s Polish television series
TVN24 original programming